Marion Brooks (1896-1987) was an American actress, entertainment journalist, and screenwriter active in Hollywood during the silent era. She was a cousin of film producer Adolph Zukor's wife.

Biography 
Marion was born in Illinois to Nathaniel Brooks and Catherine Adler. She began working as an actress in Hollywood in the early 1910s, and went on to forge a career as a screenwriter. She met and married actor Robert McKinney (who went by the name Russell Richie professionally) on a film set in 1923. From the late 1920s and into the 1940s, she was head of Paramount's fan-mail department. She also worked as an entertainment journalist; he writing appeared in film magazines like Screenland.

Selected filmography

As screenwriter 
 The Trail of the Law (1924)
 Do and Dare (1922)
 The Man Who Paid (1922)
 Ashes (1913) 
 Old Mammy's Charge (1913)
 The Judge's Vindication (1913)
 A Jolly Good Fellow (1913)
 The Fires of Conscience (1912)
 The Winner and the Spoils (1912)
 The Passer-By (1912)
 The Heir Apparent (1912)
 Freezing Auntie (1912)
 Her Diary (1912)

As actress 
 Martin Chuzzlewit (1912)
 Freezing Auntie (1912)
 Uncle Hiram's List (1911)

References 

American women screenwriters
1896 births
1987 deaths
Actresses from Chicago
20th-century American women writers
20th-century American screenwriters